Ak-Suu is a district of Issyk-Kul Region in eastern Kyrgyzstan. The administrative center lies at the village Teploklyuchenka.

Geography
Located in Kyrgyzstan's eastern corner, the district borders in the north with the Almaty Region of Kazakhstan, and in the east, with the Aksu Prefecture of China's Xinjiang Uyghur Autonomous Region. Two of Kyrgyzstan's highest mountains, Jengish Chokusu (Victory Peak, or Pobeda Peak in Russian) and Khan Tengri, are located on these borders. Some 93% of the district is occupied by mountains and 7% - by valleys

Climate
The average temperature in January is -8 °C in valleys and -26 °C - in mountains. In July, the average monthly temperature varies from +14 °C in valleys and 9 °C - in mountains. The minimum temperature drops to 40 °C below zero. The average high temperatures are from +30 °C in valleys and +15 °C - in mountains. The total precipitation is from 300 to 400 mm in valleys and from 500 to 600 mm - in mountains. The snow accumulation reaches 40 cm in valleys. The maximum expected wind speed (once in 20-year period) is 34 m/s.

Demographics
The district population, as of 2021, was 69,439. The population density was 7.0 people per square kilometer.

Ethnic composition
According to the 2009 Census, the ethnic composition (de jure population) of the Ak-Suu District was:

Populated places

In total, Ak-Suu District includes 48 settlements in 14 rural communities. Each rural community can consist of one or several villages. The rural communities and settlements in the Ak-Suu District are:

 Ak-Bulung (seat: Ak-Bulung; incl. Ak-Bulak, Toktogul and Türgön)
 Ak-Chiy (seat: Ak-Chiy; incl. Kachybek, Kök-Jayyk, Kyzyl-Jar and Sovetskoye)
 Börü-Bash (seat: Börü-Bash; incl. Cherik)
 Boz-Uchuk (seat: Novovoznesenovka; incl. Boz-Uchuk and Ichke-Jergez)
 Chelpek (seat: Chelpek; incl. Burma-Suu and Tash-Kyya)
 Engilchek (seat: Engilchek, incl. Keng-Suu, Koyluu, Kurgak, May-Saz, Tash-Koroo and Echkili-Tash)
 Jyrgalang (seat: Jyrgalang)
 Kara-Jal (seat: Tegizchil; incl. Jangy-Aryk, Kara-Jal and Boz-Bulung)
 Karakol (seat: Karakol; incl. Cholpon)
 Kerege-Tash (seat: Sary-Kamysh; incl. Kerege-Tash, Kayyrma-Aryk, Novokonstantinovka and Pioner)
 Oktyabr (seat: Oktyabrskoye; incl. Jol-Kolot, Otuz-Uul and Üch-Kaynar)
 Otradnoye (seat: Otradnoye; incl. Orlinoye and Shapak)
 Tepke (seat: Tepke; incl. Jyldyz and Kurbu)
 Teploklyuchenka (seat: Teploklyuchenka; incl. Lesnoye)

References 

Districts of Issyk-Kul Region